Banks County High School is a public co-educational high school located in Homer, in the mountains of northern Georgia, United States. The school enrolls about 928 students in grades 9-12.

School district
The school serves all of Banks County, and is part of the Banks County School District. The school is fed with students from Banks County Middle School, also in Homer.

Extracurricular activities
One of the largest clubs is the Banks County chapter of the National FFA Organization, which teaches students about various Career Development Events (CDEs), including electrical safety, in which a Banks County student won a state competition in 2014.

References

External links
 

Public high schools in Georgia (U.S. state)
Schools in Banks County, Georgia